Bottom Liners is a one-panel comic strip devised by cartoonists Eric and Bill Teitelbaum, syndicated by Tribune Content Agency. The themes of the strip are the worlds of business and finance.

The Teitelbaum brothers also are co-creators of the Pink Panther comic strip (syndicated internationally from 2004 to 2009). Their drawings have appeared in most leading publications, including The New Yorker, Forbes, Saturday Review, and Family Circle.

References

External links
 Bottom Liners at gocomics.com

American comic strips
Articles to be expanded from January 2012
Comic strips syndicated by Tribune Content Agency